Wolframs-Eschenbach is a town in the district of Ansbach, in Bavaria, Germany. It is situated 14 km southeast of Ansbach, and 36 km southwest of Nuremberg.

Wolframs-Eschenbach, formerly named "Eschenbach" and "Ober-Eschenbach", is a small town, founded in the Middle Ages, which still today preserves architecture about 500 years old.

In 1917 the town was named after its most famous son, the Minnesinger Wolfram von Eschenbach, who was a medieval poet. A notable church is the Liebfrauenmünster (Minster of our Dear Lady).

Sons and daughters of the town
 Wolfram von Eschenbach (1170-about 1220) is one of the most famous medieval poets and minstrels. His most famous work is  Parzival .
 Friedrich Dörr (1908–1993) was a German Catholic priest, professor of theology and hymnwriter, who shaped the Gotteslob hymnal.

References

Ansbach (district)